Horný Tisovník is a village and municipality in Detva District, in the Banská Bystrica Region of central Slovakia.

Genealogical resources

The records for genealogical research are available at the state archive "Statny Archiv in Banska Bystrica, Slovakia"

 Roman Catholic church records (births/marriages/deaths): 1755-1898 (parish A)
 Lutheran church records (births/marriages/deaths): 1727-1895 (parish B)

See also
 List of municipalities and towns in Slovakia

External links
https://web.archive.org/web/20070513023228/http://www.statistics.sk/mosmis/eng/run.html
Surnames of living people in Horny Tisovnik

Villages and municipalities in Detva District